Ebba Ingegerd From Svahn (23 October 1915, Helsinki – 25 November 2006, Helsinki) was a Finnish track athlete. She was one of the first four female Finnish Olympic athletes in athletics.

From qualified for the 1936 Olympic Games in Berlin in the 100 meter and 4 × 100 meter relay events.

Sources

1915 births
2006 deaths
Finnish female sprinters
Athletes (track and field) at the 1936 Summer Olympics
Olympic athletes of Finland
Olympic female sprinters
Athletes from Helsinki